Storebjørn Glacier, is a glacier in the King Frederick VI Coast, Sermersooq, southeastern Greenland. 

This glacier was named after Storebjørn, a mountain in Norway.

Geography 
The Storebjørn is an active glacier originating in the eastern side of the Greenland Ice Sheet. It flows northward at the western end of the Thorland peninsula and ends at the head of the Bernstorff Fjord (Kangertittivaq), to the south of the Bernstorff Glacier terminus. The Svartalfbjerg rises to the northwest. 

The Storebjørn is one of the fast-flowing glaciers producing massive amounts of ice that blocks the fjord.

See also
List of glaciers in Greenland

References

External links
Southeast Greenland glaciers to warm Atlantic Water from Operation IceBridge and Ocean Melting Greenland data - ResearchGate
Ocean forcing of the Greenland Ice Sheet: Calving fronts and patterns of retreat identified by automatic satellite monitoring of eastern outlet glaciers
Glaciers of Greenland
Sermersooq